Altino "Tino" Domingues (born November 2, 1951) is a retired Portuguese-American soccer defender. He played professionally in the United States and earned four caps with the U.S. national team in 1976.

Club career
In 1971 and 1972, Domingues played soccer for Montclair State. He was a 1972 New Jersey All State at Montclair. He also played for the Newark Portuguese. In 1974, he turned professional with the Rhode Island Oceaneers. In 1976, Domingues played a single season with the Hartford Bicentennials in the North American Soccer League. In 1977, he played for the New Jersey Americans in the ASL.

National team
Domingues earned his first cap in a 4–0 loss to Poland on June 24, 1976. He then played all three U.S. losses at the Mexico City Tournament in August 1976. Of his four games with the U.S., Domingues started three and came on for Werner Roth in the 46th minute of the August 18th loss to Costa Rica.

References

External links
 NASL stats

Living people
1951 births
American soccer players
American Soccer League (1933–1983) players
Connecticut Bicentennials players
New Jersey Americans (ASL) players
Newark Portuguese players
North American Soccer League (1968–1984) players
Portuguese emigrants to the United States
Rhode Island Oceaneers players
United States men's international soccer players
Sportspeople from Coimbra
Association football defenders
Montclair State Red Hawks
Soccer players from New Jersey